Trojica u mraku is the fifth album of the Croatian rock band Aerodrom, released through Jugoton in 1986. The album was named after the comic book drawn by Andrija Maurović and introduced band's frontman Jurica Pađen as a producer, with an intent to bring Aerodrom's sound back to rock. The band recorded as a trio, with Zlatan Živković returning, this time on drums. Trojica u mraku did not produce any successful singles and the band broke up several months after the album was released. It was their last album until the reunion in 2000.

Track listing
All music and lyrics written by Jurica Pađen, all arrangements by Aerodrom.

Personnel 
Aerodrom
Jurica Pađen – Guitars, lead vocals
Remo Cartagine – Bass
Zlatan Živković – Drums, vocals

Additional musicians
Laza Ristovski – Keyboards
Senad Galijašević – Gong
Miroslav Sedak-Benčić - Saxophone
Ante Dropuljić - Trumpet
Herbert Stenzel - Trombone

Artwork
Dražen Kalenić – Photography and design

Production
Jurica Pađen – Producer, except track 7 produced by Dragan Čačinović 'Čač'
Siniša Škarica - Executive producer
Recorded by Dragan Čačinović 'Čač'

References

External links
 Official Youtube channel

Aerodrom (band) albums
1986 albums
Jugoton albums